Verticordia amphigia commonly known as pixie ears is a flowering plant in the myrtle family, Myrtaceae and is endemic to the south-west of Western Australia. It is usually an open, much-branched shrub with narrow leaves and yellow flowers which sometimes produce a "sea" of colour in the wild. The flowers are surrounded by boat-shaped bracteoles which give the plant both its common and scientific names.

Description

Persistent, boat-shaped bracteoles with short hairs on their rim surround the flower. Flowering time is from October to November.

Taxonomy and naming
The species was first formally described by Alex George in 1991 and the description was published in Nuytsia from specimens collected south of Cockleshell Gully near Jurien Bay. The specific epithet (amphigia) is derived from the Ancient Greek word ἀμφίγυος (amphigyos) meaning "pointed at both ends" referring to the boat-shaped bracteoles.

George placed this species in subgenus Chrysoma, section Jugata along with V. chrysanthella, V. chrysantha, V. galeata, V. brevifolia, V. coronata, and V. laciniata.

Distribution and habitat
This verticordia grows in sand, often in association with Melaleuca rhaphiophylla and Banksia prionotes, between Cockleshell Gully and Eneabba in the Geraldton Sandplains and Swan Coastal Plain biogeographic regions.

Conservation
Verticordia amphigia is classified as "Priority Three" by the Western Australian Government Department of Parks and Wildlife, meaning that it is poorly known and known from only a few locations but is not under imminent threat.

Use in horticulture
Wild populations of this verticordia often produce a massed display of yellow flowers on red stems, indicating that the species has horticultural potential. The dried flowers retain their colour and might in future be grown commercially for the cut flower trade. Cuttings from wild plants have proven very difficult to strike but those taken from cultivated specimens have a much higher strike rate. Other methods of propagation have not as yet been trialled.

References

amphigia
Rosids of Western Australia
Eudicots of Western Australia
Plants described in 1991